Dioryctria kunmingella is a species of snout moth in the genus Dioryctria. It was described by Ping-Yuan Wang and Shih-Mei Sung in 1985 and is known from China.

References

Moths described in 1985
kunmingella